HMS Rowley  was a British Captain-class frigate of the Royal Navy in commission during World War II. Originally constructed as a United States Navy Buckley class destroyer escort, she served in the Royal Navy from 1943 to 1945.

Construction and transfer
The ship was laid down as the unnamed U.S. Navy destroyer escort DE-95 by Bethlehem-Hingham Shipyard, Inc., in Hingham, Massachusetts, on 18 August 1943 and launched on 30 October 1943. She was transferred to the United Kingdom upon completion on 22 December 1943.

Service history

She was commissioned into service with the Royal Navy, as the frigate HMS Rowley (K560) on 22 December 1943 simultaneously with her transfer, the ship served on patrol and escort duty. On 27 February 1945, she joined the British frigate  in a depth charge attack which sank the German submarine U-1208 in the English Channel southeast of the Isles of Scilly in position .

The Royal Navy returned Rowley to the U.S. Navy on 12 November 1945.

Disposal
The U.S. Navy struck Rowley from its Naval Vessel Register on 8 January 1946. She was sold on 14 June 1946 for scrapping.

References

External links
Photo gallery of HMS Rowley (K560)

 

Captain-class frigates
Buckley-class destroyer escorts
World War II frigates of the United Kingdom
Ships built in Hingham, Massachusetts
1943 ships
Royal Navy ship names